Baleizão is a Portuguese freguesia ("civil parish") of the municipality of Beja. The population in 2011 was 902, in an area of 139.74 km2.

The parish contains Monte do Olival ("Hill of the Olive Grove"), where Catarina Eufémia was murdered in 1954. She subsequently became a national icon of the resistance against the Estado Novo regime.

References

Freguesias of Beja, Portugal